625 Xenia is a minor planet orbiting the Sun. It was discovered in 1907 by August Kopff.
The name may have been inspired by the asteroid's provisional designation 1907 XN.

References

External links
 
 

Background asteroids
Xenia
Xenia
Sa-type asteroids (SMASS)
19070211